The Jackie Bell Knockout Competition is KSAFA's cup competition for clubs in Kingston and St. Andrew since the tournament's inception in 1987. Waterhouse are the current champions.

Most Championships 
 6 Arnett Gardens
   Harbour View

 4 Tivoli Gardens   
   Waterhouse

 2 Constant Spring

 1 August Town
   Boys' Town
   Duhaney Park 
   JDF
   Olympic Gardens

Past Winners  

1987/88:  Constant Spring 
1988/89:  Competition Abandoned
1989/90:  Arnett Gardens
1990/91:  Duhaney Park 
1991/92:  Arnett Gardens
1992/93:  JDF
1993/94:  Tivoli Gardens
1994/95:  Arnett Gardens
1995/96:  Harbour View
1996/97:  Waterhouse
1997/98:  Olympic Gardens
1998/99:  Arnett Gardens
1999/00:  Constant Spring
2000/01:  Harbour View

2001/02:  Waterhouse
2002/03:  Waterhouse
2003/04:  Tivoli Gardens
2004/05:  Arnett Gardens
2005/06:  Boys Town
2006/07:  Harbour View
2007/08:  Harbour View
2008/09:  Tivoli Gardens
2009/10:  August Town
2010/11:  Harbour View
2011/12:  Arnett Gardens
2012/13:  Harbour View
2013/14:  Tivoli Gardens
2014/15: Waterhouse

References

Football competitions in Jamaica